Early Entrance Program may refer to:

 Transition School and Early Entrance Program, at the University of Washington
 Early Entrance Program (CSU), at the California State University